The Summit County Rumble were a Continental Indoor Football League team located in Tallmadge, Ohio (near Akron) and that began play in 2007. The team played their home games at the Summit County Fairgrounds Arena Complex. The team was originally scheduled to play as the Toledo Rumble in the Toledo Sports Arena, but the city of Toledo, which is seeking a new arena, balked on the deal. Later on, they were going to play as the Wayne County Rumble at the Alice Noble Ice Arena in Wooster, Ohio, but a deal fell through. Finally, they were going to play at the Gault Recreation and Fitness Center, also in Wooster, but a deal fell through there as well.  With that they decided to move to Summit County and became the Summit County Rumble.

The team held the dubious distinction of being the first team to lose to the New York/New Jersey Revolution (a 48-47 loss on May 5, 2007 at the Rumble's home opener).  Later in the season, on June 16, the Rumble defeated the Revolution in Morristown by a score of 38-27, thus earning the Rumble their first (and only) win in franchise history.

On June 28, 2007 the CIFL announced that it had suspended operations of the team.

Season-By-Season

|-
|2007 || 1 || 11 || 0 || 7th Great Lakes || --

2007 Season Schedule

2007 CIFL Standings

References

Former Continental Indoor Football League teams
Defunct American football teams in Ohio
Summit County, Ohio
2006 establishments in Ohio
2007 disestablishments in Ohio
American football teams established in 2006
American football teams disestablished in 2007